Carol-Ann Kalogeropoulos (born 11 March 1943) is a Greek-American former professional tennis player.

Kalogeropoulos originally competed under her maiden name Carol-Ann Prosen and is a native of Florida. An Orange Bowl (18s) champion in 1960, she toured under the American flag until her marriage to Greek tennis player Nicholas Kalogeropoulos in 1966. She was a member of the Greece Federation Cup team between 1968 and 1973.

References

External links
 
 

1943 births
Living people
American female tennis players
Greek female tennis players
Greek people of American descent
Tennis people from Florida